Neutral theory may refer to one of these two related theories:
 Neutral theory of molecular evolution
 Unified neutral theory of biodiversity